Heliamphora sp. 'Angasima Tepui' is an undescribed taxon of marsh pitcher plant known only from the summit of Angasima Tepui in Venezuela, where it grows at elevations of 2200–2250 m. It resembles H. heterodoxa in many respects, but has a smaller nectar spoon, numerous nectar glands on the outer pitcher surface, and forms large clumps up to 1.5 m across.

References

Angasima Tepui
Flora of Venezuela
Undescribed plant species
Flora of the Tepuis